Jozo Pavič (born 1969) is a retired Croatian football defender.

References

1969 births
Living people
Association football defenders
Croatian footballers
NK Osijek players
NK Zadar players
NK GOŠK Dubrovnik players
MŠK Rimavská Sobota players
Croatian Football League players
First Football League (Croatia) players
Slovak Super Liga players
Croatian expatriate footballers
Expatriate footballers in Slovakia
Croatian expatriate sportspeople in Slovakia